Robert Allan Delgado (born 29 January 1949) is a Welsh former footballer who made 281 league appearances in a ten-year career in the Football League. He was a versatile player with power both in the air and in the tackle.

He moved from non-league Barry Town to Luton Town in 1970, before joining Carlisle United the following year. Following a loan spell with Workington in 1973, he moved on to Rotherham United. He helped the "Millers" to win promotion out of the Fourth Division in 1974–75, before joining Chester in October 1975 for £6,000. He was sold on to Port Vale for £30,000 in December 1978, before leaving the English game for American club Miami Americans in 1980. He later had spells with English club Oswestry Town, Welsh club Colwyn Bay, and Hong Kong side Bulova SA.

Career
Delgado signed for Luton Town from Barry Town in February 1970, after Harry Haslam spotted him playing for the Southern League side. However, he never took to the field at Kenilworth Road, and was moved on to Carlisle United in 1971. The "Cumbrians" finished tenth in the Second Division in 1971–72 under Ian MacFarlane. Failing to nail down a first team place at Brunton Park under new boss Alan Ashman in 1972–73, Delgado was loaned out to Workington of the Fourth Division. A move to Rotherham United followed, who had just been demoted to the basement division of the Football League. Jimmy McGuigan guided the "Millers" to 15th in 1973–74, before the Millmoor outfit returned to the Third Division with a third-place finish in 1974–75.

He moved to league rivals Chester in October 1975, with manager Ken Roberts paying out a £6,000 fee. He became a favourite with the fans thanks to his 'hard man' approach. The "Seals" finished in the lower half of the table in 1975–76 and 1976–77, as new boss Alan Oakes began to build his own team. Chester missed out on promotion in 1977–78 by two places and two points. Delgado left Sealand Road in December 1978, when Port Vale manager Dennis Butler splashed out £30,000 to secure Delgado's services. He made his debut on Boxing Day in a 6–2 defeat to Barnsley at Oakwell. He played 24 games in 1978–79 and 19 games in 1979–80, as the "Valiants" had some of their poorest seasons in the Fourth Division. Delgado never showed his best form at Vale Park, the low point in his spell coming when he scored an own goal in a 7–1 defeat to Huddersfield Town at Leeds Road. His contract was cancelled in May 1980 by new manager John McGrath, following three months on the sidelines.

He subsequently joined up with short-lived American Soccer League side Miami Americans, who only competed for the 1980 season. He then joined Welsh club Oswestry Town. He joined Hong Kong based Bulova SA for the 1983–84 season, and helped the club to secure second place in the First Division League. He then returned to Britain and played for Colwyn Bay.

Later life
Delgado later managed Upton AA in the West Cheshire League and played for veterans side Chester Nomads, while working as a sales manager for a travel company.

Career statistics
Source:

Honours
Rotherham United
Football League Fourth Division third-place promotion: 1974–75

References

1949 births
Living people
Footballers from Cardiff
Welsh footballers
Association football defenders
Association football midfielders
Cardiff Corinthians F.C. players
Barry Town United F.C. players
Luton Town F.C. players
Carlisle United F.C. players
Workington A.F.C. players
Rotherham United F.C. players
Chester City F.C. players
Port Vale F.C. players
Welsh expatriate footballers
Expatriate soccer players in the United States
Welsh expatriate sportspeople in the United States
Miami Americans players
Oswestry Town F.C. players
Expatriate footballers in Hong Kong
Welsh expatriate sportspeople in Hong Kong
Bulova SA players
Colwyn Bay F.C. players
Southern Football League players
English Football League players
American Soccer League (1933–1983) players
Hong Kong First Division League players